Arotrophora bernardmyo is a species of moth of the family Tortricidae. It is found in Myanmar.

The wingspan is about 17 mm. The forewings are brownish with darker suffusions and cream dots along the costa. The markings are brown with a rust hue. The hindwings are pale brownish.

Etymology
The species name refers to Bernardmyo, the type locality.

References

Moths described in 2009
Arotrophora
Moths of Asia